Good Samaritan Hospital or Good Samaritan Medical Center may refer to:

India
Good Samaritan Hospital (Panamattom), Koprakalam, Panamattom, Kerala
Good Samaritan Centre, Mutholath Nagar, Cherpunkal, Kottyam, Kerala

United States
Banner Good Samaritan Medical Center, Phoenix, Arizona
Good Samaritan Hospital (Los Angeles), Los Angeles, California
Good Samaritan Hospital (San Jose), San Jose, California
Good Samaritan Medical Center (West Palm Beach),  West Palm Beach, Florida
Advocate Good Samaritan Hospital, Downers Grove, Illinois
Good Samaritan Hospital (Lexington), Lexington, Kentucky
Good Samaritan Hospital (Baltimore), Baltimore, Maryland
Good Samaritan Hospital (Boston), Boston, Massachusetts
Good Samaritan Medical Center (Brockton), Brockton, Massachusetts
Good Samaritan Hospital (Suffern), Suffern, New York
Good Samaritan Hospital Medical Center (West Islip, New York), West Islip, New York
Good Samaritan Hospital (Charlotte), former hospital in Charlotte, North Carolina; Bank of America Stadium is located on this site
Good Samaritan Hospital (Cincinnati), Cincinnati, Ohio
Good Samaritan Hospital (Dayton), Dayton, Ohio
Good Samaritan Hospital (Sandusky), Sandusky, Ohio
Good Samaritan Regional Medical Center (Oregon), Corvallis, Oregon
Legacy Good Samaritan Medical Center, Portland, Oregon
Good Samaritan Hospital (Lebanon, Pennsylvania), Lebanon, Pennsylvania
Good Samaritan Hospital (Puyallup, Washington), Puyallup, Washington

See also
 The Good Samaritan (disambiguation)
 Samaritan Hospital (disambiguation)

Trauma centers